Balantidium coli is a parasitic species of ciliate alveolates that causes the disease balantidiasis. It is the only member of the ciliate phylum known to be pathogenic to humans.

Morphology

Balantidium coli has two developmental stages, a trophozoite stage and a cyst stage. In trophozoites, the two nuclei are visible. The macronucleus is long and sausage-shaped, and the spherical micronucleus is nested next to it, often hidden by the macronucleus. The opening, known as the peristome, at the pointed anterior end leads to the cytostome, or the mouth. Cysts are smaller than trophozoites and are round and have a tough, heavy cyst wall made of one or two layers. Usually only the macronucleus and sometimes cilia and contractile vacuoles are visible in the cyst, however, both nuclei are present because nuclear multiplication does not occur when the organism is a cyst. Living trophozoites and cysts are yellowish or greenish in color.

Transmission
Balantidium is the only ciliated protozoan known to infect humans. Balantidiasis is a zoonotic disease and is acquired by humans via the feco-oral route from the normal host, the domestic pig, where it is asymptomatic. Contaminated water is the most common mechanism of transmission.

Role in disease
Balantidium coli lives in the cecum and colon of humans, pigs, rats, and other mammals. It is not readily transmissible from one species of host to another because it requires a period of time to adjust to the symbiotic flora of the new host. Once it has adapted to a host species, the protozoan can become a serious pathogen, especially in humans. Trophozoites multiply and encyst due to the dehydration of feces.

Infection occurs when the cysts are ingested, usually through contaminated food or water. B. coli infection in immunocompetent individuals is not unheard of, but it rarely causes serious disease of the gastrointestinal tract. It can thrive in the gastrointestinal tract as long as there is a balance between the protozoan and the host without causing dysenteric symptoms. Infection most likely occurs in people with malnutrition due to the low stomach acidity or people with compromised immune systems.In acute disease, explosive diarrhea may occur as often as every twenty minutes. Perforation of the colon may also occur in acute infections which can lead to life-threatening situations.

Life cycle

Infection occurs when a host ingests a cyst, which usually happens during the consumption of contaminated water or food. Once the first cyst is ingested, it passes through the host's digestive system.
While the cyst receives some protection from degradation by the acidic environment of the stomach through the use of its outer wall, it is likely to be destroyed at a pH lower than 5, allowing it to survive easier in the stomachs of malnourished individuals who have less stomach acid. Once the cyst reaches the small intestine, trophozoites are produced. The trophozoites then colonize the large intestine, where they live in the lumen and feed on the intestinal flora. Some trophozoites invade the wall of the colon using proteolytic enzymes and multiply, and some of them return to the lumen. In the lumen, trophozoites may disintegrate or undergo encystation. Encystation is triggered by dehydration of the intestinal contents and usually occurs in the distal large intestine, but may also occur outside of the host in feces. Now in its mature cyst form, cysts are released into the environment where they can go on to infect a new host.

Epidemiology
Balantidiasis in humans is common in the Philippines, but it can be found anywhere in the world, especially among those that are in close contact with swine. The disease is considered to be rare and occurs in less than 1% of the human population. The disease poses a problem mostly in developing countries, where water sources may be contaminated with swine or human feces.

References

External links

 
 

Litostomatea
Parasitic alveolates
Waterborne diseases
Zoonoses
Species described in 1857